The 2002–03 Ugandan Super League was the 36th season of the official Ugandan football championship, the top-level football league of Uganda.

Overview
The 2002–03 Uganda Super League was contested by 15 teams and was won by SC Villa, while Buikwe Red Stars, Mbarara United, Game Boys FC and Akol FC were relegated.

League standings

Leading goalscorer
The top goalscorer in the 2002–03 season was Hassan Mubiru of Express FC with 16 goals.

Footnotes

External links
 Uganda - List of Champions - RSSSF (Hans Schöggl)
 Ugandan Football League Tables - League321.com

Ugandan Super League seasons
1
1
Uganda